The Most Esteemed Order of Loyalty to the Crown of Malaysia is a Malaysian federal award presented for meritorious service to the country and awarded by the sovereign.

The order was instituted on 15 April 1966 and gazetted on 30 June 1966. The order has three ranks.

Order ranks

Grand Commander

The highest class of the order is the
Grand Commander of the Order of Loyalty to the Crown of Malaysia (S.S.M.). 

The award recipient receives the title Tun and his wife Toh Puan.

The number of awards conferred is limited to 25 living recipients only at any time. The number does not include foreign citizens who receive it as an honorary award.

The fourteen-pointed star and the collar is made from silver. The badge suspends from the centre of the collar and is similar, but smaller, to the star. The riband is navy blue and has red stripes on the outer edges. The end of the riband is tied with a ribbon.

Commander

Commander of the Order of Loyalty to the Crown of Malaysia (P.S.M.). is the second class of this order.

The recipient of this award receives the title Tan Sri and his wife Puan Sri. 

This award was limited to 250 living recipients only at any time, excluding foreign citizens who receive it as an honorary award.

The badge and the design of the star are similar to that of the Grand Commander but smaller. The riband has a navy blue background and on both the edges are red stripes. In the centre are red stripes (broad) flanked by narrow ones.

Companion

The lowest class of the order is the Companion of the Order of Loyalty to the Crown of Malaysia (J.S.M.).

Only 800 living recipients are conferred this award at any time, excluding foreign citizens who receive it as an honorary award. It does not carry any title.

The badge of the Order has the same design and make as that of the Grand Cordon and the Commander. However, it is smaller with a radius of 2¼ inches. The badge suspends from a riband measuring 1¾ inches wide. It has a navy blue background and red stripes on both the edges. The badge is worn around the neck.

Recipients
Official source

Grand Commanders (S.S.M.)
The grand commander receives the title Tun and his wife Toh Puan. 
 1966: Ismail Abdul Rahman
 1967: Tan Siew Sin
 1967: V. T. Sambanthan
 1968: Syed Sheh Barakbah
 1970: Mohamed Azmi Mohamed
 1973: Mohamed Salleh Ismael
 1975: Mohamed Suffian Mohamed Hashim
 1976: Rahah Noah
 1979: Omar Ong Yoke Lin
 1980: Ismail Mohd Ali
 1981: Jugah Barieng
 1982: Syed Nasir Ismail
 1983: Raja Azlan Shah
 1985: Salleh Abas
 1987: Ahmad Zaidi Adruce
 1987: Syed Ahmad Shahabuddin
 1989: Abdul Hamid Omar
 1990: Suhailah Noah
 1991: Daim Zainuddin
 1991: Lim Chong Eu
 1992: Raja Mohar
 1993: Mohammed Hanif Omar
 1995: Ghafar Baba
 1997: Eusoff Chin
 1998: Mohamed Zahir Ismail
 2000: Ibrahim Ismail
 2001: Sulaiman Ninam Shah
 2002: Mohamed Dzaiddin Abdullah
 2003: Abdullah Mohd Salleh
 2003: Fatimah Hashim
 2003: Siti Hasmah Mohamad Ali
 2004: Ling Liong Sik
 2005: Ahmad Fairuz Abdul Halim
 2005: Ghazali Shafie
 2006: Musa Hitam
 2008: Abdul Hamid Mohamad
 2008: Ahmad Sarji Abdul Hamid
 2008: Lim Keng Yaik
 2009: Endon Mahmood
 2009: Jeanne Abdullah
 2009: Zaki Azmi
 2010: Azizan Zainul Abidin
 2011: Abdullah Ayub
 2012: Arifin Zakaria
 2017: Michael Chen Wing Sum
 2017: Md Raus Sharif
 2017: Samy Vellu
 2020: Tengku Maimun Tuan Mat
 2020: Arshad Ayub
 2020: Richard Malanjum
 2021: Raja Muhammad Alias Raja Muhammad Ali
 2022: Mohamed Hashim Mohd Ali

Commanders (P.S.M.)
The commander receives the title Tan Sri and his wife Puan Sri.

Honorary Recipients

Honorary Grand Commanders (S.S.M. (K))
The honorary grand commander also receives the title Tun and his wife Toh Puan.
 1966: Lee Tong Won
 1967: Dawee Chullasapya
 1968: Ardeshir Zahedi
 1969: Habib Bourguiba
 1969: Willy Brandt
 1971: Maraden Panggabean
 1972: Hamengkubuwono IX
 1972: Martin Charteris
 1972: Prasert Ruchirawongse
 1973: Bhanubandhu Yugala
 1973: Chatichai Choonhavan
 1973: George David Woods
 1973: Kris Sivara
 1973: Swaeng Senanarong
 1979: Serm Na Nakorn
 1982: Abdullah Abdulaziz Al Saud
 2003: Antonio Puri Purini
 2003: Franco Frattini
 2003: Gaetano Gifuni
 2009: Sirindhorn

Honorary Commanders (P.S.M. (K))
The honorary commander also receives the title Tan Sri and his wife Puan Sri.

References

External links
 Malaysia: Most Esteemed Order of the Crown of Malaysia

 
Loyalty to the Crown
Malaysia, Loyalty to the Crown
Awards established in 1966
1966 establishments in Malaysia